Jean-Julien Chervier (born 14 July 1971)  is a French writer and director whose films often deal with themes of adolescence and sexuality.

Biography

After studying Art Sciences at the Sorbonne, Jean-Julien Chervier produced a radio program devoted to the cinema on Aligre FM.
He interviewed many directors, producers and distributors in the independent French cinema industry of the mid 1990s.
These meetings gave birth to the first feature film on which he collaborated, Julie est amoureuse by Vincent Dietschy with Anne Le Ny and François Chattot.
He then directed his first short film, La Prière de l’écolier (Schoolboy's prayer), which portrays the desire of a boy of eleven years. 
The film won the Prix Beaumarchais for best screenplay and was distributed in theaters with Corps Ouverts (Open Body) by Sébastien Lifshitz.
At the same time, he was a player for Pierre Chevalier at the Arte, and a programmer at the Short Film Agency.

In the early 2000s, he co-wrote and co-directed with Agnès Obadia Du Poil sous les roses (Hair under the roses), an outspoken comedy about the awakening sexuality of two teenagers.  
The film introduced the young actors Julie Durand and Nicolas Duvauchelle.
He then became a regular creator of scenarios, giving workshops on writing and directing, collaborating in writing stories and directing more short films.
Among these are Le temps des cerises (The cherry season) with Bernard Haller and Thérèse Roussel, which obtained more praise for its interpretation.
The film, which offers an alternative vision of desire and pleasure, far from the imagery of totally smooth skin, was released in 2006 on Canal+ and shown as part of Critics' Week.

In 2009, La Fonte des neiges (Thawing out) is about a few days of a holiday when a twelve-year-old child is forced to follow his mother to a nudist camp.
At first deeply shy, he responds by wearing extra clothes.  After meeting a girl he slowly becomes more relaxed and is revealed as a responsible and gentle person.
The film deals carefully with a subject that could be controversial, and was aired on French national television (Arte).
It was chosen at international festivals such as Brooklyn, Lisbon, Ebensee and Clermont-Ferrand.

Films

References

External links

 

Living people
1971 births
French film directors